Yevhen Nemtinov (born 3 October 1995) is a Ukrainian professional footballer who plays as a midfielder for 1. FC Tatran Prešov.

Career
Nemtinov is a product of the Youth Sportive Schools in Illichivsk and Chernivtsi, then he spent his career playing for different Ukrainian club and in January 2015 signed a contract with FC Illichivets Mariupol.

He made his début for FC Illichivets Mariupol in a match against FC Chornomorets Odesa in the Ukrainian Premier League on 27 February 2015.

References

External links
Profile at FFU Official Site (Ukr)

1995 births
Living people
Sportspeople from Chernivtsi
Ukrainian footballers
Association football midfielders
Ukraine youth international footballers
FC Bukovyna Chernivtsi players
FC Mariupol players
FC Nistru Otaci players
FC Dynamo-2 Kyiv players
FC Inhulets Petrove players
FC Polissya Zhytomyr players
FC Ahrobiznes Volochysk players
FC Epitsentr Dunaivtsi players
MKS Kluczbork players
1. FC Tatran Prešov players
Ukrainian Second League players
III liga players
2. Liga (Slovakia) players
Ukrainian expatriate footballers
Expatriate footballers in Moldova
Expatriate footballers in Poland
Expatriate footballers in Slovakia
Ukrainian expatriate sportspeople in Moldova
Ukrainian expatriate sportspeople in Poland
Ukrainian expatriate sportspeople in Slovakia